Pork loin is a cut of meat from a pig, created from the tissue along the dorsal side of the rib cage.

Chops and steaks
Pork loin may be cut into individual servings, as chops (bone in) or steaks (boneless) which are grilled, baked or fried.

Joints or roasts
A pork loin joint or pork loin roast is a larger section of the loin which is roasted. It can take two forms: 'bone in', which still has the loin ribs attached, or  'boneless', which is often tied with butchers' string to prevent the roast from falling apart. Pork rind may be added to the fat side of the joint to give a desirable crackling which the loin otherwise lacks.

Back bacon
Loin can also be cured to make back bacon, which is particularly popular in the United Kingdom and Canada.

Lonzino
Lonzino is a type of salumi made in Italy of cured pork loin. It is distinct from cured pork loin which is known as lonza. In Spain, cured pork loin is known as lomo.

See also

 Cuts of pork

References

Cuts of pork